Matthew A. Bragga (born July 20, 1972) is an American baseball coach and former Utility player, who is the current head baseball coach of the Tennessee Tech Golden Eagles. He played college baseball at Kentucky for coach Keith Madison from 1991 to 1994. He then served as the head coach of the Tennessee Tech Golden Eagles (2004–2018) and the Rice Owls (2019–2021).

Playing career
Bragga was a 4-year letter winner for the Kentucky Wildcats baseball team from 1991 through 1994. He signed as a free agent with the Cincinnati Reds organization and played two years of minor league baseball for the Butte Copper Kings and the Charleston AlleyCats.

Coaching career
In 1996, Bragga began his coaching career as an assistant at Tuscaloosa County High School in Northport, Alabama. The following season, he accepted the head coaching position at Bevill State Community College. In 2001, Bragga accepted a position as an assistant coach at Birmingham–Southern College. The 2001, Birmingham–Southern finished 55–11 and won the NAIA World Series.

On December 5, 2003, Bragga accepted the position of head baseball coach at Tennessee Tech university.  He spent 15 seasons as the head coach at Tennessee Tech. After Bragga's first 3 seasons, Tennessee Tech had compiled a record of 46-109 (.297), but in his last 12 years as head coach he accumulated 400 wins and 283 losses (.585). He compiled 6 conference championships in his last 10 years at TTU, culminating with a 53-win campaign in 2018 when his Golden Eagles were 1 win away from reaching the college World Series in Omaha Nebraska.

On June 15, 2018, Bragga was announced as the new head coach of the Rice Owls baseball program.

On May 23, 2021, Bragga was fired after compiling a record of 51–76–1 in 3 seasons.

On November 8, 2021, Tennessee Tech announced that Bragga would return to Tennessee Tech as the 16th coach in program history (he was also the 13th) starting November 11, 2021.

Head coaching record

References

1972 births
Living people
Baseball first basemen
Baseball catchers
Baseball third basemen
Baseball outfielders
Kentucky Wildcats baseball players
Bevill State Bears baseball coaches
Birmingham–Southern Panthers baseball coaches
Tennessee Tech Golden Eagles baseball coaches
Butte Copper Kings players
Charleston AlleyCats players
Rice Owls baseball coaches